Theodore Robinson (1852–1896) was an American painter.

Theodore Robinson may also refer to:

 Theodore Robinson (archer), British Olympic archer.
 Theodore Robinson (cricketer) (1866–1959), English cricketer
 Theodore Douglas Robinson (1883–1934), American politician and member of the Roosevelt family
 Theodore Henry Robinson (1881–1964), British biblical scholar

See also
Ted Robinson (disambiguation)